Binibining Pilipinas 2016 was the 53rd edition of Binibining Pilipinas. It took place at the Smart Araneta Coliseum in Quezon City, Metro Manila, Philippines on April 17, 2016.

At the end of the event, Pia Wurtzbach crowned Maxine Medina as Miss Universe Philippines 2016, Janicel Lubina crowned Kylie Verzosa as Binibining Pilipinas International 2016, Christi McGarry crowned Jennifer Ruth Hammond as Binibining Pilipinas Intercontinental 2016, Rogelie Catacutan crowned Joanna Louise Eden as Binibining Pilipinas Supranational 2016, Parul Shah crowned Nicole Cordoves as Binibining Pilipinas Grand International 2016, and Ann Colis crowned Nichole Manalo as Binibining Pilipinas Globe 2016. Angelica Alita was named First Runner-Up and Jehza Mae Huelar was named Second Runner-Up.

Results
Color keys
  The contestant Won in an International pageant.
  The contestant was a Runner-up in an International pageant.
  The contestant was a Semi-Finalist in an International pageant.

Special Awards

National Costume Category
  The contestant won the Best in National Costume award.

Judges 
Binibining Pilipinas 2016 candidates were evaluated by a board of judges:

 Paolo Roxas – youth representative and university student
 Lauren Dyogi – ABS-CBN Head of Television Production
 Cory Vidanes – business executive and ABS-CBN's Chief Operating Officer for Broadcast
 Cherry Soriano – news anchor and former Philippine Ambassador to Qatar
 Betsy Westendorp de Brias – artist
 Amb. Igor Anatolyevich Khovaev – diplomat and the Ambassador of the Russian Federation to the Philippines
 Ian Veneracion – actor, licensed pilot and Philippine representative in the International Paragliding Competition
 Amb. Jan Top Christensen – diplomat, assigned to re-open the Danish embassy in Manila
 Amb. Roland Van Remoortele – career diplomat, the Ministry of Foreign Affairs of Belgium and Ambassador to the Philippines
 Olivia Jordan – actress, model and Miss USA 2015
 Sec. Adrian Cristobal Jr. – graduate of the University of California, Berkeley and Ateneo de Manila and Secretary of the Department of Trade and Industry

Contestants
40 contestants competed for the six titles.

Notes

Post-pageant Notes 

 Maxine Medina competed at Miss Universe 2016 in Manila, Philippines where she finished as a Top 6 finalist. On the other hand, Kylie Verzosa competed at Miss International 2016 in Tokyo, Japan and emerged as the winner.
 Joanna Eden competed at Miss Supranational 2016 in Krynica-Zdrój, Poland where she finished as a Top 25 semifinalist.
 Nicole Cordoves competed at Miss Grand International 2016 in Las Vegas, Nevada where she finished as First Runner-Up. After her stint in Miss Grand International, Cordoves hosted the Miss Grand International 2017 pageant, and the 2018, 2019, and 2021 editions of Binibining Pilipinas.
 Nichole Manalo competed at Miss Globe 2016 where she finished as Third Runner-Up. Initially, Manalo only finished as one of the Top 10 finalists but a week after the pageant, Manalo, together with Natasha Joubert of South Africa, was proclaimed as Third and Fourth Runner-Up respectively. The reason why the Third and Fourth Runners-Up were announced late is that the emcees of the pageant weren't able to read the envelopes in time.
 Jehza Huelar competed again at Binibining Pilipinas in 2017 and 2018. Huelar finished as a Top 15 semifinalist at Binibining Pilipinas 2017 while she won Binibining Pilipinas Supranational 2018 at Binibining Pilipinas 2018. Huelar competed at Miss Supranational 2018 in Krynica-Zdrój, Poland where she finished as a Top 10 finalist.
 Karen Ibasco later competed at Miss Philippines Earth 2017 where she emerged as the winner. Ibasco competed at Miss Earth 2017 Pasay and won.
 Dindi Pajares competed again at Binibining Pilipinas in 2017 and was unplaced. After her stint at Binibining Pilipinas, Pajares competed at Miss World Philippines 2021 where she was appointed as Miss Supranational Philippines 2021. She was voted by her fellow contestants as Miss Supranational Philippines 2021 due to the postponement of the finals night. Pajares then competed at Miss Supranational 2021 where she finished as a Top 12 semifinalist.

References

External links
 Binibining Pilipinas Official website

2016
2016 beauty pageants